The 1st Infantry Brigade was a formation of the Royal Hungarian Army that participated in the Axis invasion of Yugoslavia during World War II.

Organization 
Structure of the division:

 Headquarters
 1st Infantry Regiment
 31st Infantry Regiment
 1st Artillery Regiment
 1st Independent Cavalry Squadron
 1st Anti-Aircraft Battery
 1st Signal Company
 1st Service Regiment
 Attached Mining Section

Notes

References

 

Military units and formations of Hungary in World War II